A women's march was held on October 2, 2021, in protest of a recent abortion law in the U.S. state of Texas, the Texas Heartbeat Act. The demonstration was announced on September 2. More than 90 organizations participated. Although organizers of the Washington, D.C. march applied for a permit for 10,000 people, actual attendance was around 5,000.

Participation

Roughly 5,000 attendees in Washington D.C. met in Freedom Plaza and marched to the United States Supreme Court Building. Speakers at the rally included Cristela Alonzo, Schuyler Bailar, activist Monica Simpson, and Planned Parenthood president Alexis McGill Johnson.

Several cities in Texas held events. In Austin thousands gathered on the lawn of the Texas Capitol building, where speakers included Cecile Richards, a Texan and former president of Planned Parenthood.

Marches also took place in New York, Chicago and Los Angeles.

Some attendees wore t-shirts with "1973" printed on them, which is the year of the Roe v. Wade court decision that legalized abortion throughout the United States. Many speakers warned of a looming threat to this court decision.

See also
 List of 2021 Women's March locations

References

External links 

October 2021 events in the United States
2021 in American politics
2021 protests
Abortion in the United States
Women's marches in the United States
History of women in Texas
2021 Women's March